Colostethus mertensi is a species of frog in the family Dendrobatidae, currently threatened by habitat loss. Endemic to Colombia, its natural habitats are subtropical or tropical moist montane forests, rivers, and intermittent freshwater marshes.

References 



Mertensi
Amphibians of Colombia
Amphibians described in 1964
Taxonomy articles created by Polbot